Lazar Tomanović, PhD (3 September 1845 – 2 November 1932) was a Montenegrin and Dalmatian Serb writer, politician and diplomat, who served as the fifth Prime Minister of Montenegro, as well the first Prime Minister of the Kingdom of Montenegro, under the regime of King Nikola I.

Biography

Early life and education
Lazar Tomanović was born on 3 September 1845 in Lepetane, a village near Herceg Novi in Bay of Kotor. At the time it was part of the Kingdom of Dalmatia within the Austrian Empire. Having finished elementary and secondary school in Herceg Novi, Tomanović studied in Novi Sad and Budapest and received his doctorate in law in Graz. He was a member of Parliament of Dalmatia (Diet) as representative of Serb People's Party in the Kingdom of Dalmatia.

Prime Minister of Montenegro
He became Prime Minister of Montenegro with support of Royalist True People's Party in April 1907 and held the office for several terms until June 1912. He also served Minister of Foreign Affairs and Minister of Justice of Montenegro. During his second term, Montenegro was proclaimed a sovereign kingdom.

References

1845 births
1932 deaths
People from Herceg Novi
Montenegrin politicians
Montenegrin diplomats
Prime Ministers of Montenegro
Serbian politicians
Serbian diplomats
Serbs of Montenegro